Anatol Vieru (8 June 1926 – 8 October 1998) was a Romanian-Jewish music theoretician, pedagogue, and composer. A pupil of Aram Khachaturian, he composed seven symphonies, eight string quartets, concertos, and chamber music. He also wrote three operas: Iona (1976), Praznicul Calicilor (1981), and Telegrame, Tema si Variatiuni (1983). He was awarded the Herder Prize in 1986.

He was the father of pianist, writer, and mathematician Andrei Vieru.

List of works

Dramatic 
Iona (op, 1, after M. Sorescu and sketches by M.C. Escher), 1972–75, concert perf. Bucharest, 31 October 1976
Praznicul calicilor [The Feast of the Beggars] (op, after M. Sorbul), 1978–80, Berlin, 1991
Telegrame (mini-op, after I.L. Caragiale), 1983
Tema cu variatiuni [Theme and Variations] (mini-op, after Caragiale), 1983
Ultimele zile, ultimele ore [The Last Days, the Last Hours] (op, 3, after A.S. Pushkin: Motsart i Sal'yeri and M.A. Bulgakov: Poslednie dni [The Last Days]), 1990–95

Film scores
(names of dirs. in parentheses):
Când primavara e fierbinte [When Spring is Hot] (M. Saucan), 1960
Ciucurencu (E. Nussbaum), 1964
Procesul alb [The White Trial] (I. Mihu), 1965
Brâncusi la Târgu-Jiu [Brâncusi at Târgu-Jiu] (Nussbaum), 1966
Soarele negru [Black Sun] (S. Popovici), 1968
O suta de lei [100 Lei] (M. Saucan), 1972
Felix si Otilia [Felix and Otilia] (Mihu), 1974
Marele singuratic [The Great Lonesome] (Mihu), 1976
Intoarcera lui Voda Lapusneanu [Lapusneanu's Return] (M. Ursianu), 1979

Orchestral
Symphonies:
no.1 'Oda tacerii' [Ode to Silence], 1967
no.2, 1973
no.3 'La un cutremur' [Earthquake Sym.], 1978
no.4, 1982
no.5 (M. Eminescu), chorus, orch, 1984–85
no.6 [Exodus], 1989
no.7 'Anul soarelui calm' [The Year of the Silent Sun], 1992–93

Other:
Suita în stil vechi [Suite in an Olden Style], for strings, 1945
Dansuri simfonice, 1952
Concerto for Orchestra, 1954–55
Flute Concerto, 1958
Simfonia de camera, 1962
Cello Concerto, 1962
Jocuri (Jeux), piano, orchestra, 1963
Violin Concerto, 1964
Clepsidra I (Sonnenuhr), 1968–69
Muzeu muzical [Museum Music], harpsichord, 12 strings, 1968
Screen (Ecran), 1969
Clarinet Concerto, 1975
Sinfonietta, 1975
Concerto for violin, cello and orchestra, 1979
Sinfonia concertante, cello and orchestra, 1987
Narration II, sax and orchestra, 1985
 Memorial, 1990
 Psalm, 1993
 Piano Concerto 'Caleidoscop', 1993
 Malincolia furiosa, viola and orchestra, 1994
 Hibernal, panpipes, strings, 1995
 Flute Concerto no.2, 1996
 Guitar Concerto, 1996
 Musik, organ and strings, 1996
 Elegia II, cello, doublebass and chamber orchestra, 1998

Vocal
Choral:
 Mierla lui Ilie Pintilie [Ilie Pintilie's Blackbrid] (cant.), 1949
 Miorita [The Ewe Lamb] (oratorio), 1957
 Cantata anilor lumina [Light Years Cant.] (N. Cassian), 1960
 Scene nocturne (F. García Lorca), 2 choruses, 1964
 Vocale [Vowels] (G. Ungaretti), female chorus, 1963
 Clepsidra II (folk texts), chorus, panpipes, cymbal, orchestra, 1971
 Fratele cel sarac [The Poor Brother] (I. Neculce), 1993
 Daniil, 1994
 In marea apusului [In the Sea of Sunsets], chorus, trumpet, timpani, 1998

Solo:
 Muzica pentru Bacovia si Labis [Music for Bacovia and Labis], 1959–63:
 The Struggle against Inertia, mezzo-soprano, tenor, flute, violin, piano
 Nocturnes and Resonances of Bacovia, soprano, flute, piano
 Truces, mezzo-soprano, piano
 Discul lui Newton [Newton's Disc], 12 solo vv, 1972
4 unghiuri din care am vazut Florenta [4 Angels to See Florence], soprano, piano/harpsichord, 1–2 percussionists, 1973
Cântec arhaic de dragoste [Ancient Love Songs] (Bible: Solomon):
 I.   Sage mir an, Mez, flute, oboe, clarinet, bassoon, 1985
 II.  O that you were a Brother to Me, 8vv, 1987
 III. Siehe, du bist schön, Mez, a sax, 1985
 IV.  Fa-ma precum o pecete [Set Me as a Seal upon your Heart], 4vv, flute, oboe, clarinet, bassoon, horn, 1989
 V.   Ja nartsis saronskij [I am a Rose of Sharon], chorus, 1987;
 Poveste [Marches], Sprechstimme, percussion, 1993
 Archipelagos, baritone, vibraphone, 1994
 Dechanson (T. Tzara), 4vv, 1995
 Questions et responses (P. Celan, P. Solomon), 4vv, 1995
 Iarba ochilor tai [The Grass of your Eyes] (Celan), 4vv, 1997

Chamber and solo instrumental

String quartets:
 no.1, 1955
 no.2, 1956
 no.3, soprano and string quartet, 1973
 no.4, 1980
 no.5, 1982
 no.6, 1986
 no.7, 1987
 no.8, 1991

Other:
 Clarinet Quintet, 1957
 Kammersymphonie, 1962
 Trepte ale tacerii [Steps of Silence], string quartet, percussion, 1966
 Nautilos, piano, tape, 1969
 Sita lui Eratostene [The Riddle of Eratosthanes], clarinet, violin, viola, cello, piano, 1969
 Nasterea unui limbaj [The Birth of a Language], piano 4 hands, 1971
 Mozaicuri [Mosaics], 3 percussionists, 1972
 Iosif si fratii sai [Joseph and his Brothers], 11 instruments, tape, 1979
 Scoica [Shell], 15 strings, 1982
 Double Duos, a sax/b clarinet, vib/mar, 1983
 Ma–jo–r Music, flute, clarinet, harp, string quartet, 1984;
 Metasaks, sax, dea (1984);
 Soroc I, 6 studies, percussion, 1984
 Soroc II, 7 instruments, 1984
 Sonata, violin, cello, 1984–5
 Diaphonie, cello, doublebass, 1987
 Trînta [Wrestling], sax, percussion, 1987;
 Epistolaire, a flute, piano, 1988
 Multigen, a flute, oboe, a sax, percussion, piano, 1988
 Giusto, sax, 2 guitars, synth, percussion, 1989
 Versete [Verses], 1989
 Sax Quartet, 1990
 Sax-Vier, sax quartet, 1991
 Trio microtonic, bassoon, guitar, doublebass, 1992
 Feuerwerk, flute, violin, vibraphone, 1994
 Craciun [Christmas], violin, piano, 1994
 Canto, oboe, percussion, 1995
 Couple, clarinet, viola, 1995
 Duo leggiero, flute, percussion, 1995
 Rubato, oboe, percussion, 1995
 Toccatina, 2 guitar, 1995
 Chanson de geste, guitar, cello, 1996
 Gruss, violin, cello, piano, organ, 1996
 Masca [Masks], flute, cello, doublebass, 1996
 Canon und Fuge, piano 4 hands, 1997
 Elegia I, sax, organ, 1997
 Et in Arcadia ego, 3 recorders, 1997
 Posviascenie [Dedication], trumpet, cello, timpani, 1997
 Trio, violin, cello, piano, 1997
 Centaurus, sax, trombone, percussion, 1998

Solo:
 Din lumea copiilor [From the Realm of Childhood], 8 miniatures, piano, 1958
 Sonata, cello, 1963, arr. cello, percussion (1977)
 Narration, organ, 1973
 Piano Sonata, 1976
 Pelinarium, synthesizer, 1986
 Dar I [Gift], flute, 1988
 Dar II, cello, 1989
 Design-Dasein, flute+a flute+piccolo, 1993
 Piano Sonata, 1994
 Ritmuri [Rhythms], piano, 1994
 Adio, piano, 1996
 Eppur si muove, flute, 1996
 Sandu, piano, 1996
 Schöntok, piano, 1996
 Capriccio, violin, 1997
 Voeu, piano, 1997

References

1926 births
1998 deaths
Romanian classical composers
Romanian opera composers
Jewish classical composers
Jewish opera composers
Jewish musicologists
Romanian Jews
Music theorists
20th-century classical composers
Male classical composers
Male opera composers
Herder Prize recipients
20th-century musicologists
20th-century male musicians